Ates is a given name and a surname which may refer to:

 Roscoe Ates (1895–1962), American vaudeville performer, actor, comedian and musician
 Sonny Ates (1935–2010), American racecar driver
 Ates Diouf (born 2000), Senegalese footballer 
 Ates Gürpinar (born 1984), German politician

See also
 Ateş (disambiguation)